Franco Ferreiro and André Sá were the defending champions but decided not to participate.
Andrés Molteni and Marco Trungelliti won the final against Rogério Dutra da Silva and Júlio Silva 6–4, 6–3.

Seeds

Draw

Draw

References
 Main Draw

Campeonato Internacional de Tenis de Santos - Doubles
2012 Doubles